The government of Macau confers honors every year in the form of decorations, medals and honorary titles.

Categories
The decorations, medals and honorary titles awarded by the government of the Macau Special Administrative Region of China can be divided into medals of honour, medals of merit, distinguished service medals, and honorary titles.

Medals of honor
Grand Lotus, the highest award under the MSAR honors and awards system, recognizes lifelong and highly significant contributions to the wellbeing of Macau.

The first two persons given this honor in 2001 were:
 Ma Man-kei (1919–2014) – late business tycoon, former Chairman of the Macau Chamber of Commerce, former member of the Legislative Assembly of Macau, former Vice-Chairman of Chinese People's Political Consultative Conference.
 Tong Seng Chiu, former president of the Macao Federation of Workers' Union

Golden Lotus is awarded for distinguished services to the community or who have rendered public or voluntary services of high merit.

The first three persons given this honor in 2001 were:
 Stanley Ho – business tycoon and casino owner
 Chui Tak Kei – entrepreneur, social activist and philanthropist; late uncle of Macau Chief Executive Fernando Chui
 Lao Kuong Po – community activist, dentist and founding chairman of the Macau General Union of the Neighborhood Associations

Silver Lotus is awarded for leadership in public affairs and/or voluntary work over a long period.

The first three persons given this honor in 2001 were:
 Roque Choi (1921–2006) – late businessman and founder of Seng Heng Bank, former vice-president of the Commercial Association of Macau, former President of the Leal Senado, member of the Macau Legislative Assembly, member of the Chinese People's Political Consultative Conference
 Liang Pi Yun (1907–) – social activist, educationalist, journalist, poet and calligrapher

Medals of merit
There are seven types of medal of merit awarded by Macau:

 Professions 
 Industry and Commerce
 Tourism 
 Education 
 Culture
 Philanthropy 
 Sports

Distinguished service medals
 Medal for Bravery
 Medal for Dedication
 Medal for Community Service

Honorary titles
 Honourific Title of Prestige
 Honourific Title of Merit

Colonial orders, decorations and medals (pre-1999)

Prior to transfer of sovereignty in 1999, the Portuguese honors system was in use.

Military decorations were awarded to Portuguese military personnel serving in Macau only:

 Armed Forces Expeditions Commemorative Medal and Armed Forces Special Service Commissions Commemorative Medal – Macau

Civilian and Civil awards given by the Macau Government:

 Medal of Professional Merit (Government of Macau)
 Medal of Value (Government of Macau)
 Medal of Cultural Merit (Government of Macau)

Portuguese orders given to Portuguese and Macanese in Macau:

 Order of Aviz (Ordem Militar de Aviz)
 Grand Cross (GCA)
 Grand Officer (GOA)
 Commander (ComA)
 Officer (OA)
 Knight (CavA) or Dame (DamA)
 St George's Cross (1st Class)
 Order of Christ (Ordem Militar de Christo)
 Grand Cross (GCC)
 Grand Officer (GOC)
 Commander (ComC)
 Knight (CavC) or Dame (DamC)
 Order of Prince Henry (Ordem do Infante Dom Henrique)
 Grand Collar (Grande Colar – GColIH)
 Grand Cross (Grã-Cruz – GCIH)
 Grand Officer (Grande- – GOIH)
 Commander (Comendador – ComIH)
 Officer ( – OIH)
 Knight / Dame (Cavaleiro / Dama – CavIH / DamIH)
 Silver Medal (Medalha de Prata – MedPIH) and a Gold Medal (Medalha de Ouro – MedOIH)
 Order of the Tower and Sword (Ordem Militar da Torre e Espada do Valor, Lealdade e Mérito)
 Grand Collar (GColTE)
 Grand Cross (GCTE)
 Grand Officer (GOTE)
 Commander (ComTE)
 Officer (OTE)
 Knight (CavTE) or Dame (DamTE)

References

External links
 Medalhas e Títulos Honoríficos (Medals and Honorary Titles)  – orders, legislation, etc. pertaining to the medals and honorary titles of Macau as hosted on the website of the Government Printing Bureau
 Administrative Regulation No. 28/2001 on the Medals and Honorary Titles in Chinese and in Portuguese hosted on the website of the Government Printing Bureau
 2003 awards reported in People's Daily
 Aged public servant awarded medal of honor in Macao

 
Macau-related lists